WWE Super ShowDown (originally stylized as Super Show-Down) was a professional wrestling event produced by WWE, an American-based promotion. It was broadcast live and available only through pay-per-view (PPV) and WWE's livestreaming service, the WWE Network. The 2020 event was the last event held under the titular name, with the 2021 event ultimately getting postponed. Since then, there hasn't been any further events scheduled under the name.

Established in 2018, each of the three iterations of the event only took place in countries outside the United States. The first event was held in Australia and was WWE's first and so far only PPV event held in the country. The final two events were held in Saudi Arabia as part of a 10-year partnership in support of Saudi Vision 2030.

History 
In June 2018, the American professional wrestling promotion WWE announced that it would be returning to Australia to hold a pay-per-view (PPV) and WWE Network event, which would be the company's first PPV event produced in the country. The event was titled Super Show-Down and was held at Melbourne Cricket Ground in Melbourne, Victoria on October 6, 2018. Although WWE had held tours in Australia, the company's last big event to be held in the country was the Global Warning Tour in 2002.

Also in early 2018, WWE began a 10-year strategic multiplatform partnership with the General Sports Authority in support of Saudi Vision 2030, Saudi Arabia's social and economic reform program. The first PPV and WWE Network event under this partnership, the Greatest Royal Rumble, was held at the King Abdullah Sports City's King Abdullah International Stadium in Jeddah on April 27, 2018. In 2019, WWE held Super ShowDown (stylized without a dash) as their third event under this partnership, and subsequently the second event in the Super ShowDown chronology. The event was held on June 7, 2019, also at the King Abdullah International Stadium. A second Super ShowDown in Saudi Arabia was then held on February 27, 2020, at the Mohammed Abdu Arena on the Boulevard in Riyadh, thus making the event a recurring event in the Saudi Arabian partnership.

Due to the ongoing COVID-19 pandemic that began in mid-March 2020, an event was not held in 2021. COVID restrictions were lifted later that year, and WWE returned to Saudi Arabia with the Crown Jewel event in October. Super ShowDown was not included in WWE's initial PPV slate for 2022; the company's first PPV in Saudi Arabia for the year would ultimately be Elimination Chamber in February, and their only other Saudi Arabian PPV for 2022 was announced as Crown Jewel in November.

Events

See also
 WWE in Australia
 WWE in Saudi Arabia

References

Recurring events established in 2018
WWE pay-per-view events